Vâna Mare may refer to the following rivers in Romania:
 Vâna Mare, a tributary of the Cernat in Buzău County
 Vâna Mare (Lanca Birda), in Timiș County
 Vâna Mare (Timiș), in Caraș-Severin and Timiș Counties